SigFig may refer to:

 SigFig (company), a portfolio tracking and investment adviser referral service, previously known as Wikinvest
 Significant figures, the digits of a number that carry meaning contributing to its measurement resolution